Acanthaspis pedestris is a species of assassin bug that functions as a beneficial insect in agricultural systems.

References

Reduviidae
Insects described in 1863
Insects of Asia